Bounty Bay is an embayment of the Pacific Ocean into Pitcairn Island. It is named after the Bounty, a British naval vessel whose eighteenth-century mutiny was immortalized in the novel Mutiny on the Bounty, and the numerous subsequent motion pictures made of it. The mutineers sailed the Bounty to Pitcairn Island and destroyed it by fire in the bay. Current Pitcairn Islanders are largely lineal descendants of the mutineers, as exhibited by some of their surnames. 

Travellers to Pitcairn are usually brought in by longboat into Bounty Bay.

External links
 Photos of Pitcairn – including Bounty Bay
 Map of Pitcairn Island

Bays of the Pacific Ocean
Landforms of the Pitcairn Islands
Bays of Oceania